Robert Barton Englund (born June 6, 1947) is an American actor and director. He is best known for playing the supernatural serial killer Freddy Krueger in the Nightmare on Elm Street film series. Classically trained at the Royal Academy of Dramatic Art, Englund began his career as a stage actor in regional theatre, and made his film debut in Buster and Billie in 1974. After supporting roles in films in the 1970s such as Stay Hungry, A Star Is Born, and Big Wednesday, Englund had his breakthrough as the resistance fighter Willie in the miniseries V in 1983. Following his performance in the original A Nightmare on Elm Street in 1984, he became closely associated with the horror film genre, and is widely-regarded as one of its iconic actors.

Early life
Englund was born on June 6, 1947, in Glendale, California, the son of Janis (née MacDonald) and John Kent Englund, an aeronautics engineer who helped develop the Lockheed U-2 airplane. He is of part Swedish ancestry and part Scottish ancestry. Englund began studying acting at the age of twelve, accompanying a friend to a children's theater program at California State University, Northridge.

While in high school, he attended Cranbrook Theatre School (organized by the Cranbrook Educational Community) in Bloomfield Hills, Michigan. He then attended UCLA for three years, before dropping out and transferring to Michigan's Oakland University, where he trained at the Meadow Brook Theater, at the time a branch of the Royal Academy of Dramatic Art.

Englund had five successful years performing in regional theater including plays by Shakespeare and Bernard Shaw. He married for the first time in 1968 to a nurse Elizabeth Gardner, whom he divorced in 1972. Shortly afterward, he returned to the West Coast in search of film work, and landed a supporting role in the film Buster and Billie, directed by Daniel Petrie.

Career
In 1976, Englund auditioned for the role of Han Solo and Luke Skywalker in Star Wars. While he didn't get either part, he suggested Mark Hamill for the role of Luke. Englund appeared in the 1977 film Eaten Alive directed by Tobe Hooper. He then played Ranger in Galaxy of Terror, produced by Roger Corman, which was released in 1981. Since then, Englund has made over 100 appearances on film and television. In his early film roles, Englund was usually typecast as a nerd or a redneck, and he first gained attention in the role of Visitor technician and resistance fighter Willie in the 1983 miniseries V, as well as the 1984 sequel V: The Final Battle, and V: The Series, in which he was a regular cast member.

But after such typecasting, Englund went against type when he accepted the role of Freddy Krueger, the psychotic burn victim and child murderer in Wes Craven's hugely successful A Nightmare on Elm Street in 1984. He reprised his role as Freddy Krueger in A Nightmare on Elm Street 2: Freddy's Revenge (1985), A Nightmare on Elm Street 3: Dream Warriors (1987),  A Nightmare on Elm Street 4: The Dream Master (1988), A Nightmare on Elm Street 5: The Dream Child (1989), Freddy's Dead: The Final Nightmare (1991), Wes Craven's New Nightmare (1994) and Freddy vs. Jason (2003). His association with the genre led him to top-billed roles in The Phantom of the Opera (1989), The Mangler (1995) – another film directed by Tobe Hooper, and 2001 Maniacs (2005).

Englund is one of only four actors to portray a horror character eight consecutive times, the other three being Doug Bradley, who portrayed the Pinhead character eight times in the Hellraiser film series, Tobin Bell who played Jigsaw, and Brad Dourif who plays Chucky. Englund has said that he enjoys the role of Freddy as it gives him a break from always acting out the nice guy; indeed, many people who have worked with Englund attest to his congeniality. Makeup artists responsible for the Krueger makeup have commented that Englund was so friendly and talkative that it made the lengthy makeup application slightly more challenging.

Englund's TV appearances include starring in the short-lived series Nightmare Cafe (1992), in which he played Blackie, the mysterious proprietor of the title cafe, and reprising his role of "Freddy Krueger" in the series Freddy's Nightmares – A Nightmare on Elm Street: The Series. His guest roles include the science fiction series Babylon 5, one episode of the show MacGyver as Tim Wexler, Masters of Horror, MadTV, Sliders, and Knight Rider, where he appeared as a phantom haunting a film studio, and Walking Tall: The Series as well as a guest star spot on the hit TV show Walker, Texas Ranger.

His work in voice-over animation includes magician Felix Faust in Justice League, The Riddler on The Batman, The Vulture on The Spectacular Spider-Man, and as Dormammu on The Super Hero Squad Show. On the TV witch drama Charmed (Episode: "Size Matters"), he appeared as a demon who used the services of a lackey to lure people into a decrepit household (where he lived in the walls) and shrank them down to action figure size. He also appeared on an episode of Married... with Children as The Devil. Another appearance was in a 2010 season episode of the television spy send-up Chuck, as a scientist who created a fear-inducing nerve toxin, a similar character to the Scarecrow, one of Batman's enemies in the DC Comics (A character he later portrayed in the video game Injustice 2).

Englund performed as host of the Horror Hall of Fame awards show three times from 1989 to 1991.

Englund made his directorial debut with the 1988 horror film 976-EVIL, co-written by future Oscar winner Brian Helgeland and starring Stephen Geoffreys. During production, Englund met set decorator Nancy Booth, whom he married. His second feature, Killer Pad, was released direct-to-DVD in 2008. During July 2013, he was in pre-production to direct The Vij, about a young priest who is led by an evil genie to commit murder, and who falls in love with an old witch who is not what she seems.

Englund also directed 2 episodes of “Freddy's Nightmares” first was “Cabin Fever” and the second “Monkey Dreams”.

His memoir, Hollywood Monster: A Walk Down Elm Street with the Man of Your Dreams, which Alan Goldsher transcribed from his dictations, was published by Pocket Books on October 13, 2009.

He had also starred in the web series "Fear Clinic", where he appeared in five episodes as Dr. Andover.

Englund noted he would welcome a guest appearance in the ABC revival of V in an interview with Todd Sokolove from Forces of Geek. But the series was canceled before he could make such a guest appearance.

In January 2010, it was announced that Englund would return as Jackson Roth for the sequel to Dee Snider's Strangeland, titled Strangeland II: Disciple. However, as of December 2010, no specific dates or plans had been made regarding the project.

Englund made a guest appearance in "The Death of the Queen Bee" episode of Bones, appearing as a quirky janitor at protagonist Dr. Temperance Brennan's old high school. His character, a friend of Brennan's, and situation were introduced as "very creepy... it's like Freddy creepy." Englund was a special guest at the 2010 Streamy Awards, and also appeared as a special guest of the CA Weekend of Horrors on 8 October 2010.

Englund appeared on the Creation Entertainment Weekend of Horrors in May 2010. In May 2010, he was signed for the American independent thriller Inkubus.

Englund appeared as himself in the Call of Duty: Black Ops Zombies map, "Call of the Dead" as one of the playable characters, and acted out the part of a Halloween-themed serial killer in the 2010s revival of Hawaii Five-0. He also took part in a Halloween Come Dine with Me for Channel 4 in 2012. He also appeared in Jack Brooks: Monster Slayer and Behind the Mask: The Rise of Leslie Vernon.

Although the character of Freddy Krueger is regarded as one of the most terrifying in cinema history, Englund is often described by fellow actors and film crews as being extremely friendly and appreciative of his fans, many admitting that his portrayal of Krueger frightened them as children.

He starred in The Last Showing and Fear Clinic, the latter was released on October 22, 2014 at the Screamfest Film Festival. Englund was also a special guest at Shock Comic Con on Valentine's Day 2015. In February 2016, Englund hosted a "Nightmare on Elm Street" marathon on El Rey Network.

Englund was featured in the 2019 documentary Scream, Queen! My Nightmare on Elm Street, which examines the LGBT themes of A Nightmare on Elm Street 2: Freddy's Revenge and the life of actor Mark Patton.

As of 2020, Englund has been hosting the Travel Channel show True Terror with Robert Englund, which showcases scary but true stories about the supernatural or strange.

In 2022, Englund appeared in the fourth season of the hit show Stranger Things as Pennhurst Mental Hospital patient Victor Creel.

Filmography

Film

Television

Music videos

Web

Video games

Accolades

References

External links

Robert Englund interview with the Horror Asylum
Robert Englund interview by Ladyghost
Robert Englund interview by AOL Canada
Robert Englund interview with The Phantom Zone

1947 births
Living people
Alumni of RADA
American male film actors
American male television actors
American male voice actors
American people of Scottish descent
American people of Swedish descent
California State University, Northridge alumni
Film directors from California
Male actors from Glendale, California
Oakland University alumni
University of California, Los Angeles alumni
20th-century American male actors
21st-century American male actors